Don P. Moon (b. 1936) is an American academic administrator, minister, and former nuclear reactor physicist. He was the president of Shimer College from 1978 to 2004, and has been on the faculty of Shimer College since 1967.

Early life and education
Moon was born in 1936 in Manila. He was the son of Don P. Moon, an admiral in the United States Navy. Moon earned a Bachelor of Science in Engineering Physics from Cornell University in 1957, and a Master of Science in Reactor Engineering from New York University in 1958. Moon worked as a nuclear reactor physicist at Argonne National Laboratory from 1959 to 1964. He subsequently completed a Master of Divinity at Nashotah House, an Episcopalian seminary, in 1965.

Career 
From 1966 to 1967 Moon taught at Sauk Valley Community College in Dixon, Illinois.
In 1967, Moon joined the natural sciences faculty of Shimer College in nearby Mount Carroll, Illinois. While an instructor, he held administrative positions including Chairman of the Natural Sciences Program, Director of the Oxford Program, Dean of Students and Dean of Faculty. After the attempted closure of the college by the Board of Trustees in 1973, Moon became one of a small group of faculty known as the Shimer Steering Committee, who coordinated efforts to save the college.  

Moon became president of Shimer College on March 18, 1978. The college moved from Mount Carroll to Waukegan in the winter of that year, remaining there until 2006. Moon's leadership style as president was characterized as "collegial and low key", and he was credited with providing a necessary calming influence during the difficult negotiations surrounding the liquidation of the Mount Carroll Campus. During Moon's subsequent tenure, enrollment more than tripled, from 40 students to 130, and the new Waukegan campus was expanded from two buildings to 12. In 2004, Moon stepped down from the presidency but continued to teach; he was succeeded as president by William Craig Rice.

See also

History of Shimer College
List of Shimer College people

Works cited

References

External links
Faculty profile of Don Moon

Living people
Cornell University College of Engineering alumni
Polytechnic Institute of New York University alumni
Nashotah House alumni
Shimer College faculty
Presidents of Shimer College
1936 births
20th-century American academics
21st-century American academics